Serra de l'Espadella is an over  long mountain range in the Baix Maestrat comarca, Valencian Community, Spain. Its highest point is Espadella (968 m). These mountains are frequently covered in snow in the winter.

Geography
This mountain chain rises south of the Serra del Turmell, between the almost abandoned village of Vallivana and the Moles de Xert, to the northeast of the Serra de Vallivana, on the other side of the valley through which the N-232 road passes. This sparsely populated mountain area has the most important forested zone of the region.

The main wild animals in these unpopulated mountains are the Spanish Ibex, Roe Deer and Wild Boar.

See also
Maestrat/Maestrazgo
Mountains of the Valencian Community

References

External links
El País Valencià poble a poble; comarca a comarca - El Baix Maestrat
Els Ports : Vallivana – Vereda del Turmell - Vallivana

Espadella
Espadella
Baix Maestrat